Layers is an album by pianist Les McCann recorded in 1972 and released on the Atlantic label.

Reception

AllMusic gives the album 4½ stars, stating "This groundbreaking jazz synthesizer record is really unlike any other Les McCann ever made. Aside from a three-man percussion section and electric bassist Jimmy Rowser, Layers is entirely electronic, one of the first jazz albums with such an emphasis. ...this music is truly forward-looking and ahead of its time".

The song "Sometimes I Cry" has been sampled in several other songs, most notably in Slick Rick's "Behind Bars" and its drum beat in Massive Attack's "Teardrop" and "Bullet Boy".

Track listing 
All compositions by Les McCann
 "Sometimes I Cry" - 5:22
 "Let's Gather" - 1:13
 "Anticipation" - 0:52
 "The Dunbar High School Marching Band" - 6:07
 "Soaring (At Dawn) Part I"- 5:54
 "The Harlem Buck Dance Strut" - 5:55
 "Interlude" - 0:33
 "Before I Rest" - 3:43
 "Let's Play ('til Mom Calls)" - 4:26
 "It Never Stopped in My Home Town" - 1:54
 "Soaring (At Sunset) Part II" - 8:03

Personnel 
Les McCann - piano, electric piano, synthesizer, clavinet, drums, timpani
Jimmy Rowser - bass, electric bass, bells, percussion
Donald Dean - drums, bells, percussion
Buck Clarke - congas, drums, bongos, blocks, bells, percussion
Ralph MacDonald - congas, bells, percussion

References 

Les McCann albums
1973 albums
Atlantic Records albums
Albums produced by Joel Dorn